Bernard Sadoulet (born 23 April 1944 in Nice) is a French physicist.

Sadoulet studied from 1963 to 1965 at the École polytechnique and received his doctorate in 1971 at University of Paris-Sud in Orsay. From 1966 to 1973 he worked at CERN and from 1976 at Lawrence Berkeley National Laboratory. He was involved in the design of the UA1 detector at CERN.

In the 1990s and 2000s, he was engaged in the search for dark matter in the form of WIMPs. He developed cryogenic detectors to discover these WIMPs through the phonons they generated by collisions in crystals. Specifically, he initiated the Cryogenic Dark Matter Search (CDMS) experiments at the Soudan Underground Laboratory in Minnesota with Blas Cabrera Navarro.

In 2013 he received the Panofsky Prize with Blas Cabrera. Sadoulet is a Fellow of the American Physical Society, the American Academy of Arts and Sciences, and the American Association for the Advancement of Science. In 2012 he was elected a member of the National Academy of Sciences. Since 1985 he is a professor at the University of California, Berkeley. There from 1989 to 2001 he was director of the Center for Particle Astrophysics. He is currently the director of the LBNL Institute for Nuclear and Particle Astrophysics and Cosmology (INPA).

His doctoral students include Vuk Mandic.

Selected publications
 with Joel Primack, D. Seckel: Detection of Cosmic Dark Matter, Ann. Rev. Nucl. Part Sci., Vol. 38, 1988, pp. 751–807

References

French physicists
University of Paris alumni
University of California, Berkeley faculty
Fellows of the American Academy of Arts and Sciences
Fellows of the American Physical Society
Fellows of the American Association for the Advancement of Science
Members of the United States National Academy of Sciences
1944 births
Living people
People associated with CERN
École Polytechnique alumni